The Quetta Gladiators (often abbreviated as QG) is a franchise cricket team which competes in Pakistan Super League (PSL). The team is based in Quetta, the provincial capital of Balochistan, Pakistan. The team was coached by Moin Khan, and captained by Sarfaraz Ahmed.

Squad 
 Players with international caps are listed in bold.
Ages are given as of the first match of the season, 27 January 2022

Season standings

Points table

Regular season

References

External Links
 Team records in 2022 at ESPNcricinfo

2022 in Balochistan, Pakistan
2022 Pakistan Super League
Gladiators in 2022
2022